PoliticsNation with Al Sharpton is an American political talk show broadcast on MSNBC, hosted by Al Sharpton. It began on August 29, 2011, on MSNBC's weekday 6 PM slot, the first time that the slot had been occupied by a branded series since January 2011.

In August 2015, it was announced that the series would move to just once a week on Sundays at 8AM starting on October 4, 2015. The series aired its final weekday episode on September 4, 2015. In October, 2020, PoliticsNation was rescheduled to Saturdays and Sundays, airing at 5:00 p.m. Eastern Time both days.

History

6 PM slot prior to renaming
PoliticsNation was the formal renaming of the 6 PM weekday slot that had been occupied by a broadcast named MSNBC Live (sharing the same "generic" title as the primary morning-to-afternoon rolling-news program primarily staffed by anchors.) Sharpton had served as host of the slot since July, and was preceded by Cenk Uygur from January to June. Prior to Uygur, the slot had been occupied by The Ed Show from April 6, 2009, to January 24, 2011 (eventually moving to the 10 PM slot following Keith Olbermann's departure from MSNBC), and by 1600 Pennsylvania Avenue from March 17, 2008 (as Race to the White House) to April 3, 2009.

5 PM slot in year 2021
As of 2021, PoliticsNation is a 60-minutes program including the commercial times. It airs at 5 pm Eastern time in the United States on weekends. American Voices with Alicia Menendez airs after PoliticsNations. Yasmin Vossoughian's MSNBC Live program airs before Al Sharpton's PoliticsNation.

Al Sharpton and MSNBC
Sharpton's involvement with MSNBC began after June 29, 2011, when he became the primary substitute host for The Ed Show, leading to press speculation that Sharpton could attain his own series on the network in the vein of Rachel Maddow (who attained her own series in 2008 after serving as Keith Olbermann's primary substitute host on Countdown with Keith Olbermann), Lawrence O'Donnell (who attained his own series in 2010 after having served as Olbermann's primary substitute host) and Christopher Hayes (who attained his own weekend series beginning in mid-September 2011 after having served as a regular fill-in for both Maddow and O'Donnell).

Reception
After beginning his appearances as substitute host for Ed Schultz, conservative commentators and outlets slammed MSNBC's decision to hire Sharpton as a contributor (and even more so after becoming host of what became PoliticsNation); EURweb cited mockery of Sharpton by such conservative outlets as Breitbart.tv in particular, doubts were raised by at least one member of the National Association of Black Journalists about Sharpton's ability to host a credible political talk show following past controversial comments, and criticism by African-American journalists raised the possibility of MSNBC having hired Sharpton in order to draw ratings. In response, Tamika Mallory, executive director of the National Action Network (which is headed by Sharpton as president) rebutted many of the criticisms in an editorial for TV One's NewsOne website, and also likened black criticism of MSNBC's decision to "crabs in a barrel".

Parody
Sharpton's style of delivery, verbalized understanding of topics on PoliticsNation and a live flub with the teleprompter have been the subject of parody, especially on NBC series Saturday Night Live with Kenan Thompson playing Sharpton. It was the subject of a December 10, 2011 skit parodying the flub as well as a May 19, 2012 skit with guest star Mick Jagger as a JPMorgan Chase executive. Sharpton himself enjoyed the skits, and had Thompson on his show in February 2015. Sharpton returned the favor by appearing on SNL in March 2016.

References

External links

MSNBC original programming
2011 American television series debuts
2010s American television talk shows
2010s American television news shows
English-language television shows
2020s American television news shows